Jean Turco (born 19 December 1917) is a French politician.

Turco was born in Villejuif on 19 December 1917. On 6 August 1972, Turco succeeded Hubert Germain as a member of the National Assembly representing Paris's 14th constituency. Germain reclaimed the seat on 1 April 1973, but was replaced for a second time by Turco on 6 May 1973. Turco served uninterrupted until 2 April 1978.

References

1917 births
Living people
People from Villejuif
Politicians from Île-de-France
Union of Democrats for the Republic politicians
Deputies of the 4th National Assembly of the French Fifth Republic
Deputies of the 5th National Assembly of the French Fifth Republic